52 kilometr is a rural locality (a passing loop) in Oborskoye Rural Settlement of Imeni Lazo District, Russia. The population was 31 as of 2012. There are 3 streets.

Geography 
The settlement is located on the right tributary of the Obor River, 65 km east of Pereyaslavka (the district's administrative centre) by road. Obor is the nearest rural locality.

Streets 
 Dachnaya
 Dorozhnaya
 Lesnaya

References 

Rural localities in Khabarovsk Krai